Abdelkefi is a surname. Notable people with the surname include:

Ahmed Abdelkefi (born 1941), Tunisian economist and businessman
Fadhel Abdelkefi (born 1970), Tunisian businessman and politician, son of Ahmed